Sonia LeBel is a Canadian politician, who was elected for the Coalition Avenir Québec to the National Assembly of Quebec in the 2018 provincial election. She represents the electoral district of Champlain as a member of the Coalition Avenir Québec.

As a lawyer, LeBel was chief prosecutor of the Charbonneau Commission into collusion within Quebec's construction industry. She was also the province's Director of Criminal and Penal Prosecutions, focusing on drugs and organized crime.

LeBel was appointed Minister of Justice in the Legault Cabinet on October 18, 2018 and served until June 22, 2020.

Cabinet posts

References

Living people
Coalition Avenir Québec MNAs
Justice ministers of Quebec
Lawyers in Quebec
21st-century Canadian politicians
Members of the Executive Council of Quebec
Women government ministers of Canada
Women MNAs in Quebec
Year of birth missing (living people)
21st-century Canadian women politicians